Ernest Alan Fitch (10 March 1915 – 7 August 1985) was a British Labour Party politician.

Fitch was educated at Kingswood School, Bath (1927–1932), and was a mineworker. He represented mineworkers on the executive committee of the Lancashire and Cheshire Regional Council of Labour.

He was elected to the House of Commons as Member of Parliament for Wigan in a by-election in 1958, following the death of sitting Labour MP Ronald Williams.  He was re-elected at the next seven general elections, before stepping down at the 1983 general election, when the seat was held for Labour by Roger Stott.

Fitch was one of only two MPs for Wigan in the 20th century to stand down (retire) rather than die in office. His successor Roger Stott reverted to the trend and died in office in 1999.

Fitch was a government Assistant Whip from 1964 to 1966, a Lord Commissioner of the Treasury from 1966 to 1969 and Vice-Chamberlain of the Household from 1969 to 1970, and was a member of the nationalised industries select committee.
Fitch was also a Member of the European Parliament.

References
Times Guide to the House of Commons 1979

External links 
 

1915 births
1985 deaths
English miners
Labour Party (UK) MEPs
Labour Party (UK) MPs for English constituencies
MEPs for the United Kingdom 1973–1979
Members of the Parliament of the United Kingdom for Wigan
Ministers in the Wilson governments, 1964–1970
National Union of Mineworkers-sponsored MPs
People educated at Kingswood School, Bath
UK MPs 1955–1959
UK MPs 1959–1964
UK MPs 1964–1966
UK MPs 1966–1970
UK MPs 1970–1974
UK MPs 1974
UK MPs 1974–1979
UK MPs 1979–1983